Sven Fredrik Johannes Sixten (born 21 October 1962) is a Swedish composer, cathedral organist and conductor. Sixten was born in Skövde, Sweden. He earned his Bachelor of Arts (1986) at the Royal College of Music, Stockholm. He studied composition with Professor Sven-David Sandström and is now recognized as one of Sweden's best-known composers of church music. He is published at all major publishing houses in Sweden.

He was the conductor of Gothenburg's boys choir between 1997 and 2001. Today he is the cathedral organist of Härnösand's Cathedral. His music is represented on several CD recordings and as a conductor one of his five CDs went gold. His music has been performed on Swedish Radio, e.g. his En svensk Markuspassion for two choirs, chamber orchestra and soloists (2004). The Jazz mass was performed 1999 on Swedish television.

Music 
Sixten writes first and foremost church music, particularly liturgical music for choir and organ in a variety of combinations. In addition he has also written a number of chamber music compositions.

His music is the  product of an eclectic and comprehensive knowledge of musical history, with the «Master of the Baroque», Johann Sebastian Bach, and 20th century French composers as significant sources of inspiration. Sixten’s musical language also integrates various aspects of jazz technique and of the folk music of his native Sweden.

Most of his works are traditional in structure. His production ranges from large-scale works, such as operas, oratorios and passion to chamber works, including sonatas, toccatas and preludes, not to mention a multitude of contributions to the choral repertoire.

His treatment of the traditional forms is nevertheless characterized by a forward-looking attitude, which includes local and regional forms of expression, an interest in gender roles and a generally contemporary tonal language. These aspects are evident in En svensk Markusspassion, written in 2003, which is the first setting of the passion in Swedish influenced by Swedish  folkmusic , and the first work to use a female singer in the role of Evangelist ever.

With his background as a practising church musician Sixten has to a large extent written music suitable not only for concert performance but also for liturgical use. He has produced a wide range of material suitable for use by average congregations and choirs. In addition to a considerable number of choral works of moderate difficulty he has also been involved in the revision of the Swedish national hymn book. His attitude towards the listener is also such that his production can be appreciated both by musical specialists and non-specialists alike.

Similarly, in his instrumental music Sixten is anxious to communicate by making music which “sounds good”, even though the harmonies can be challenging and the music can take unexpected turns. He does not wish to be regarded as “traditional” or “modern”, but rather as a synthesis of the two.

Partial list of works

 5 hymns for the Church of Sweden's Hymnal
 Jazz Mass
 Stabat Mater for cello solo and choir (SSAA)
 Ave verum corpus
 O magnum mysterium
 Laudate Dominum
 O sacrum convivium
 Credo
 Pie Jesu
 Mariahymn
 Ropa ut din glädje, dotter Sion! (Daughter of Zion, rejoice!)
 Döden tänkte jag mig så
  Vår Fader (Our Father)
 Bana väg för Herren (Prepare the way of the Lord)
 Var inte rädd för mörkret (Be not afraid of the dark)
 Marias vaggvisa
 Requiem for string orchestra, 2 horns and timpani, choir and two soloists (soprano and bass) - also published in an English version.
 Cantata for the St. Lucia for choir, soprano solo and string orchestra (1984)
 Sonatas for violin and piano, and cello and piano (1985)
 String Quartet (1985)
 Prelude et Fugue (1986)
 Messa Misteriosa (2002) for solo organ
 Triptyk (2004)
 En svensk Markuspassion (A Swedish St. Mark Passion) for two choirs, chamber orchestra and soloists (2004)
 Sonata for organ (2006)
 Chaconne for string quartet (2007)
 Three sacred Dances for choir (SSAA), string quartet and piano (2007)

References

External links
 https://web.archive.org/web/20070902113443/http://www.fredriksixten.se/
 http://www.farm.se/wps/2005/03/12/markuspassionen-2/
 http://www.svenskakyrkan.se/harnosanddomkyrko/
 http://www.goteborgsgosskor.se/ 
 http://www.lesjolies.nu/ 
 http://www.nosag.se/cd/cd906.html

1962 births
Living people
Swedish classical composers
Swedish male classical composers
Swedish classical organists
Male classical organists
Swedish conductors (music)
Male conductors (music)
21st-century conductors (music)
21st-century organists
21st-century Swedish male musicians